Sericomyia lata   (Coquillett 1907), the  White-spotted Pond Fly , is a common species of syrphid fly observed across North America, concentrated in the east. Syrphid flies are also known as Hover Flies or Flower Flies because the adults are frequently found hovering around flowers from which they feed on nectar and pollen. The larvae of this genus are known as rat tailed maggots for the long posterior breathing tube.

References

External links

 

Diptera of North America
Hoverflies of North America
Eristalinae
Hoverfly genera
Articles created by Qbugbot
Insects described in 1907
taxa named by Daniel William Coquillett